Empagliflozin/linagliptin, sold under the brand name Glyxambi, is a fixed-dose combination anti-diabetic medication used to treat type 2 diabetes. It is a combination of empagliflozin and linagliptin. It is taken by mouth.

The most common side effects include urinary infections, nasopharyngitis, and upper respiratory tract infections .

It was approved for use in the United States in January 2015, for use in the European Union in November 2016, and for use in Australia in December 2016.

Medical uses 
In the United States empagliflozin/linagliptin is indicated as an adjunct to diet and exercise to improve glycemic control in adults with type 2 diabetes mellitus and to reduce the risk of cardiovascular death in adults with type 2 diabetes mellitus and established cardiovascular disease.

In the European Union empagliflozin/linagliptin is indicated in adults aged 18 years and older with type 2 diabetes mellitus:
 to improve glycemic control when metformin and/or sulphonylurea (SU) and empagliflozin or linagliptin do not provide adequate glycemic control;
 when already being treated with the free combination of empagliflozin and linagliptin.

Adverse effects 
The most common side effects include urinary infections, nasopharyngitis, and upper respiratory tract infections . The most serious side effects include ketoacidosis (high blood levels of acids called ‘ketoacids’), pancreatitis (inflammation of the pancreas), hypersensitivity (allergic reactions) and hypoglycaemia (low blood sugar levels).

History
The combination preparation was developed and is marketed by Boehringer Ingelheim and Eli Lilly and Company under the brand name Glyxambi.

References

Further reading

External links
 

Anti-diabetic drugs
Boehringer Ingelheim
Combination drugs
Eli Lilly and Company brands